David Faulkner (born 8 October 1975) is an English former footballer who played as a defender for Darlington in the Football League.

References

External links

Gresley profile

1975 births
Living people
Footballers from Sheffield
English footballers
Association football defenders
Sheffield Wednesday F.C. players
Darlington F.C. players
Gainsborough Trinity F.C. players
Alfreton Town F.C. players
Hallam F.C. players
Waterford F.C. players
Sheffield F.C. players
English Football League players
Gresley F.C. players